Grevillea elongata is a species of flowering plant in the family Proteaceae and is endemic to the south-west of Western Australia. It is a shrub with divided leaves with sharply-pointed linear lobes, and conical or cylindrical groups of white flowers.

Description

Taxonomy
Grevillea elongata was first formally described in 1994 by Peter M. Olde and Neil R. Marriott in The Grevillea Book from specimens collected by Olde near Ruabon in 1991. The specific epithet (elongata) means "lengthened".

Distribution and habitat
Ironstone grevillea grows in heath, often near creeks and is restricted to an area near Busselton and Ruabon in the Swan Coastal Plain biogeographic region of south-western Western Australia.

Conservation status
Grevillea elongata is listed as "vulnerable" under the Australian Government Environment Protection and Biodiversity Conservation Act 1999 as "Threatened" by the Western Australian Government Department of Biodiversity, Conservation and Attractions, meaning that it is in danger of extinction. The main threats to the species are weed invasion, grazing by rabbits, and habitat loss and disturbance.

See also
 List of Grevillea species

References

elongata
Proteales of Australia
Eudicots of Western Australia
Plants described in 1994